The WTA 125 tournaments are the secondary professional tennis circuit organised by the Women's Tennis Association. The 2022 calendar consists of twenty-four tournaments.

Schedule

Statistical information 
These tables present the number of singles (S) and doubles (D) titles won by each player and each nation during the season.  The players/nations are sorted by: 1) total number of titles (a doubles title won by two players representing the same nation counts as only one win for the nation); 2) a singles > doubles hierarchy; 3) alphabetical order (by family names for players).

To avoid confusion and double counting, these tables should be updated only after an event is completed.

Titles won by player

Titles won by nation

Points distribution

See also 

2022 WTA Tour
2022 ITF Women's World Tennis Tour
2022 ATP Challenger Tour

Notes

References 

 
2022 in women's tennis
2022